Malcolm Thomson (born 29 December 1968) is a Scottish football coach and former player. He was appointed joint-head coach of Rangers WFC in January 2020. In 2015–16 he was head coach of Indian I-League team Salgaocar.

Coaching career

Early career
After retiring at the age of 25 while trying to make it with Aberdeen, Thomson went into coaching. He was given youth coaching roles at Celtic, Hibernian, and Rangers before becoming first-team assistant coach at Inverness Caledonian Thistle under Craig Brewster. Thomson spent two spells at Inverness, with the spell in between at Dundee United. He then joined the coaching staff at Birmingham City as their assistant coach for a season before moving to the United Arab Emirates to be assistant coach under David O'Leary at Al-Ahli. After another spell at Rangers, Thomson became assistant coach to Stuart Taylor at League of Ireland club, Limerick.

Thomson then took on the assistant coaching role under Barry Ferguson at both Blackpool and Clyde. He then briefly returned to Rangers in 2015.

Salgaocar
On 26 June 2015, Thomson took on his first head coaching role with Indian I-League side, Salgaocar. After losing his first four I-League matches in a row, Thomson was relieved of his duties.

Statistics

Managerial statistics
.

References

External links
Malky Thomson career stats at Post-War Players Database

1968 births
Living people
Association football defenders
I-League managers
Scottish football managers
Salgaocar FC managers
Rangers F.C. non-playing staff
Aberdeen F.C. players
Montrose F.C. players
Rangers W.F.C. managers
Women's association football managers
Scottish footballers
Scottish Women's Premier League managers
Scottish Football League players
Footballers from Renfrewshire
People from Johnstone
Association football coaches
Inverness Caledonian Thistle F.C. non-playing staff
Dundee United F.C. non-playing staff
Birmingham City F.C. non-playing staff
Clyde F.C. non-playing staff
Blackpool F.C. non-playing staff
Scottish expatriate football managers
Scottish expatriate sportspeople in India
Expatriate football managers in India
Scottish expatriate sportspeople in the United Arab Emirates
Scottish expatriate sportspeople in Ireland